"Holding Out for You" is a song by Italian rapper Fedez featuring Swedish singer Zara Larsson. It is the third single from Fedez's fifth studio album, Paranoia Airlines (2019).

Music video
The song's music video was premiered 15 January 2019 on the Vevo rapper channel - YouTube and it was filmed at the San Pellegrino Terme casino presenting Fedez and Zara Larsson as protagonists.

Track listing
Digital download
"Holding Out for You" (featuring Zara Larsson) – 3:01

Charts

Certifications

References

2019 singles
2019 songs
Zara Larsson songs
Fedez songs
Songs written by Zara Larsson
Songs written by Michele Canova
Sony Music singles